Jermaine Jones is an American international soccer player.

Jermaine Jones may also refer to:

Jermaine Jones (American football) (born 1976), Arena football player
Jermaine Jones (singer) (born 1986), American singer and contestant in American Idol

See also
Jamaine Jones (born 1998), Australian footballer